"Mr. Crowley"  is a song by British heavy metal vocalist Ozzy Osbourne, about English occultist Aleister Crowley. Written by Osbourne, guitarist Randy Rhoads and bass guitarist/lyricist Bob Daisley, it was released on Osbourne's debut solo album Blizzard of Ozz in September 1980 in the United Kingdom. A live version was released as a UK single in November 1980. In North America, the studio version was released as a single in 1981. 

The song begins with a keyboard solo by Don Airey. "I just cleared [the band] out of the studio and said, 'Come back in half an hour,'" he recalled. "Ozzy came back, heard it, and said, 'You just plugged into my head, man.'"

The first guitar solo by Randy Rhoads became one of the best known in heavy metal. It was ranked on 28th place in the list of the best guitar solos by the readers of Guitar World.

The song was ranked the 23rd greatest heavy metal song of all time, according to a readers' preferences poll held by Gibson.

Overview
"Mr. Crowley" was the second of two singles from Blizzard of Ozz, after "Crazy Train". It was inspired by a book about Aleister Crowley that Osbourne had read, and a deck of tarot cards found in the studio as recording of the album was commencing. Crowley was an English occultist and ceremonial magician who had founded the Thelemite religion in the early 20th century.

In popular culture
The official guide to the video game Fallout 3 uses the lyrics to the song in its walkthrough of You Gotta Shoot 'em in the Head. The game also features a ghoul character named "Mister Crowley".

This song was also featured in the game Brütal Legend.

The song was included in Guitar Hero World Tour, along with "Crazy Train" and an in-game avatar of Ozzy himself, who becomes unlocked as a playable character upon completing both songs in the vocalist career, and was made available to download on 31 May 2011 for play in the Rock Band 3 music gaming platform in both Basic rhythm, and PRO mode.

On Ozzy Osbourne's 'Hellraiser (30th Anniversary Edition - Official Animated Video)' video, the legend "Mr. Crowley" appears on the sides of the van.

Personnel 
 Ozzy Osbourne – vocals
 Randy Rhoads – guitar
 Bob Daisley – bass
 Don Airey – keyboards
 Lee Kerslake – drums

Certifications

Other versions
The Cardigans released an a capella version on the B side of their 1995 single 'Carnival'.

See also
 Mr. Crowley Live EP

References

Ozzy Osbourne songs
1980 singles
Songs written by Randy Rhoads
Songs written by Ozzy Osbourne
Songs about writers
Cultural depictions of Aleister Crowley
Songs written by Bob Daisley
1980 songs
Epic Records singles
Jet Records singles